Muangthong United Football Club is a Thai professional football club based in Muang Thong Thani, Nonthaburi province. The club plays in the Thai League 1. Muangthong United has participated in the Thai Premier League since 2009 after having won the Thai Division 1 League title in 2008.

Muangthong United were for a period one of the richest football clubs in Thailand. The club is also known as The Kirins or The Twin Qilins.

History

Formation and early years
The club was founded in 1989. The first name registered with Football Association of Thailand was "Norgjorg Pittayanusorn School Football Team". The club was founded by Worawi Makudi, the club race from Ngor Royal Cup which is the smallest cup. Even in Thailand Football League Division 1 season 2002–2003, The club was renamed to "FC Norgjorg Black Pearl" by the former politician Veera Musikapong to make the team, but the team had just one season and was unsuccessful so he stopped by leaving the team and the club still remained in the League Division. The next season of the Thailand League Division 1 in 2003–2004 the team was renamed once again as a group that has been done the team as FC Globlex Norgjorg by Somsak Chenchaowanich who signed as the new team manager. That year, the team performed poorly. Finally, it must be relegated to play in Ngor Royal Cup in season 2004–2005 by returning to its original name but it was not as successful as it should.

The Kirins - 3 years 3 champs
The Football Association wants to raise the level of league competition in Thailand so they established Thailand Division 2 League with a team led by Kho Royal Cup and Khor Royal Cup are mixed together to compete in the league this season which Norgjorg Pittayanusorn Football Club eligible entrants. In 2007 Siam Sport Syndicate by Rawi Lohtong the president of Siam Sport Syndicate bought the club and changed the name to Muangthong United F.C. and moved to a new ground at Muang Thong Thani called Thunderdome Stadium. The club's first success was winning the first place in the 2007 Season of the Thailand Division 2 League. From here, they were promoted to the Thai Division 1 League. The team was then promoted to the Thai League 1 in the 2009 season so everyone praised Muangthong United in that season as "3 Years 3 Champs".

The club was promoted to play in the Thai Premier League in 2009, after it won the title for the Division one. In the 2009 season, the club had many new and notable players in the country. Despite a successful start to the season, they pledged in April 2009 with Attaphol Buspakom a new coach. For the summer break, the association is, as expected by all experts, among the top five of the table and plays for the championship.

One factor contributing to the club's success is its close relationship with Belgian club Lierse, and the acquisition of Thai star player Teeratep Winothai and Ronnachai Rangsiyo, the striker from PEA FC. Together with Teerasil Dangda, the club now has some of the most talented strikers in the country in its ranks.

The Thai giant
In 2010, Attaphol Buspakom was sacked following a string of unsuccessful results, and was replaced by Belgian René Desaeyere, who managed Muangthong for two seasons. Under his leadership, Muangthong qualified for the 2010 AFC Champions League. They beat SHB Đà Nẵng from Vietnam 0–3 but lost out to Singapore Armed Forces on penalties after the game ended in a 1–1 draw. They were eligible to play for the 2010 AFC Cup. They reached the semi-final round but lost to Al-Ittihad from Syria 2–1. In the 2010 Thai Premier League, they lost just three games out of 30, with seven draws, good enough to capture the league title for the second time. Dagno Siaka was the club's top scorer for in 2010 with 15 goals.

At the start of the 2011 season Muangthong United signed former Liverpool player Robbie Fowler to a one-year contract. Muangthong United participated in the 2011 AFC Champions League play-off rounds. They played Sriwijaya but lost on penalties after the game ended in a 2–2 draw. They were also eligible to play for the 2011 AFC Cup, coming first in the group stage of the tournament. In their first match of the round of 16 they beat Al Ahed from Lebanon 4–0 but went on to lose to Kuwait SC in the quarter-finals round 1–0. After their tournament exit Henrique Calisto, the club's manager, was sacked and Fowler took over as player/coach of Muangthong United.
In 2011 Thai Premier League Muangthong United finished the season in third place in Thai league. For the 2010–11 season and Teerasil Dangda is top score for club in 2011 season by 13 goals.

After Fowler's contract expired, Muangthong United signed a contract with Serbia coach Slaviša Jokanović. During the pre-season, Muangthong United signed on many famous players such as Mario Gjurovski, Ri Kwang-Chon, Adnan Barakat, Mongkol Namnuad, and the young player that crowned as best younger of Thailand etc.

In 2012 season, the club did not play in the AFC Champions League or AFC Cup. Therefore, it tried to do the best in 2012 Thai League Cup, but they lost to TOT 3–4 and 2012 Thai FA Cup they lost to Army United 3–2, but they can win the 2012 Thai Premier League is a third of the club and Muangthong United became the first team in Thai Premier League to go the season unbeaten in the current 34-game format. In 2012,
thumb
Muangthong engaged an unbeaten run which lasted the whole season, and Teerasil also scored four goals in a single match, an 8–1 routing over BBCU on 18 October. Ten days later he scored in a 2–2 draw against BEC Tero, a goal which granted the title, took his tally to 24 goals and broke the previous record of Ronnachai Sayomchai in 1998 (23 goals).

After his impressive goal tally in the season, Teerasil was invited by La Liga sides Atlético Madrid and Getafe for a trial, but as the former was a Muangthong partner, he headed to Atlético Madrid in January 2013; he also attracted interest of Trabzonspor in June.

End of the drought

In 2016, Not having won any trophies for three seasons in a row, the club started a campaign called "The Dream Team" and signed many famous national team players such as Peerapat Notchaiya, Theerathon Bunmathan, Adisak Kraisorn, Tanaboon Kesarat, Chanathip Songkrasin, Tristan Do, Adison Promrak, and international players such as Xisco. They also brought in Totchtawan Sripan, ones of Thai football legends, as the new head coach. All this resulted in Muangthong United winning the double, as they became champions of the Thai League 1 and League Cup.

In 2017, After finishing champions in the 2016 Thai League season, The Kirins secured direct qualification into the 2017 AFC Champions League. In the group stages, for Home games Muangthong beat Kashima Antlers, 2–1 and beat Ulsan Hyundai, 1-0 and beat Brisbane Roar, 3–0. The club finish runners-up in Group E. For their home and final leg of the Champions League Round of 16 – a home and away series against Japanese side Kawasaki Frontale. Having lose the first leg, 1–3 in Thailand and Frontale defeat Muangthong United, 4–1 in the second leg.

Academy
The Kirins Academy has a clear aim of providing a place to pursue and achieve success through a first class coaching environment for all the young players registered in its system to produce players that will play and succeed in the first team at Muangthong United. In the beginning the club use the youth development service from JMG Academy that sign an agreement with Muangthong United and Robert Procureur who was the Director of JMG Thailand on 2007 to 2011, the academy created most of the talent player such as Suriya Singmui, Phitiwat Sukjitthammakul, Weerawut Kayem, Picha Autra, Suphanan Bureerat continue to 2011 the club started an own youth development program due to AFC club licensing standard that tries to develop young player from 12 to 18 years old so that they created MTU Academy, from this development, the club has produced many players for the national team since Thitipan Puangchan, Korrawit Tasa, Poramet Arjvirai, Patcharapol Intanee.

Sponsorship
The following are the sponsors of MTUTD (named "MTUTD Partners"):

Title and Shirt Sponsors

Supporters

Muangthong United play their home games in the SCG Stadium, originally designed for about 5,000 spectators. The stadium, unlike most stadiums in Thailand, has no running track. Due to the success of the club and the increasing number of spectators, the stadium was built with steel tube stands with 15,000 seats during the 2008 season. After the end of the 2009 season a plan to expand the stadium was conceived. As the stadium was only originally designed for a capacity of approximately 15,000 spectators, the expansion increased the capacity to 25,000. It is also one of the few stadiums in Thailand to have VIP areas.

The club managed to develop a very large fan base in a short time. At away games, the fans are represented very numerous mot. Games against Chonburi and Bangkok Glass are among the highlights of the season. This 2009 new attendance records for the league could be set up in the season. For the games against Chonburi and Bangkok Glass, there was even a first time ticket sales. This should slow down the expected rush for tickets. For football in Thailand, this was a novelty. The core of fans of Muangthong consists of the Ultra Muangthong. They were also the first who brought the Ultra movement in Thailand's stages. Large banners, flags and double holder characterize the Fans, as well as a "pre-Inger" with megaphones.

The environment of the organization is considered to be extremely professional. The newcomer to the Thai Premier League is the previous top Chonburi in terms of marketing and merchandise while in nothing and is even there to overtake him. The owner of the club, the Siam Sports Syndicate, this is one of the largest media companies in the sport of Thailand. Thus, the company was the sponsor of the Thai FA Cup in 2009 and also has the rights to the live broadcasts of the Thai Premier League.

Rivalries

Muangthong United has rivalries with Buriram United, Port, Chonburi, against whom they contest the Thailand Clasico, and TOT SC, against whom they contest the Chaeng Watthana derby.

The rivalry with Port is rooted in Kor Royal Cup stampede when Port was forfeited due to crowd riots in 2009. In 2014 Muangthong United fans and Port fans were riot with armed rebellion at Udon Ratthaya Expressway in Pak Kret Expressway area so that police and military were come out to fix the problem . In 2016 the fans of these 2 team were making riot it again in the same area this event makes Football Association of Thailand must introduce measures for something to solve this problem.

The rivalry with Buriram United arises from the numerous times the two teams, as well as Buriram United is represent as rustic people and Muangthong United is represent as urban people, In the samesides these two team was represent two different politics party sides in Thailand that sent their member to elect for presidents of Football Association of Thailand, have battled for the Thai League 1 title this fixture has become known as one of the finest Thai League match-ups in history.

Affiliated clubs

 Atletico Madrid (2011–present)
Muang Thong United have entered a ground breaking alliance with Spanish club Atletico Madrid in 2011. The collaboration agreement also includes "a program of periodic exchange of players and coaches", "playing friendly matches together" and "selling each others merchandise in their stadiums".

2 years later, Muangthong striker Teerasil Dangda joined Atletico for a trial in January 2013 and the club has sent youth players to practice football with Atletico Madrid, resulting in them becoming the club's key players at a later time, such as Phitiwat Sukjitthammakul, Thitiphan Puangjan and Suriya Singmui.

In 2021, the club reconsider sending the new generation of youth players to a three-month training to develop their football talents with Atletico Madrid.

 Assumption United (2015–present)
 Muangthong United signed a collaboration agreement with Assumption Thonburi school. In the past, many players who graduated from Assumption Thonburi school joining the Muangthong united first team such as Theerathon Bunmathan, Teerasil Dangda, Kawin Thamsatchanan, Sarach Yooyen, Chatchai Saengdao, Sorawit Panthong and Shinnaphat Leeaoh.

 Urawa Red Diamonds (2021–present)
Muang Thong United have entered a ground breaking alliance with Japanese club Urawa Red Diamonds in 2021. This agreement to be of benefit to both clubs through the exchange of young players and coaches, shared knowledge on technical–training methods and playing friendly matches together.

Stadium

Thunderdome Stadium is a football stadium located in Nonthaburi, Thailand, and is the home of Thai League 1's side, Muangthong United. Thunderdome Stadium was the first operate football stadium in Thailand, while PAT Stadium and TOT Stadium Chaeng Watthana constructed without operate including there are others older stadiums, they're all considered as multi-purpose stadiums.
The stadium used to be able to hold as much as 20,000 spectators but the number reduced after renovation by filling in chairs to make the stadium all seated with a capacity of 15,000 people.

Stadium and locations

Continental record

Performance in AFC competitions
AFC Champions League: 7 appearances
 2010: Play-off round
 2011: Play-off round
 2013: Group stage
 2014: Play-off round
 2016: Play-off round
 2017: Round of 16
 2018: Play-off round
AFC Cup: 2 appearances
 2010: Semi-finals
 2011: Quarter-finals

Season by season record

P = Played
W = Games won
D = Games drawn
L = Games lost
F = Goals for
A = Goals against
Pts = Points
Pos = Final position
N/A = No answer

TPL = Thai Premier League
TL = Thai League
T1 = Thai League 1
DIV 1 = Thailand League Division 1
DIV 2 = Thailand League Division 2

QR1 = First Qualifying Round
QR2 = Second Qualifying Round
QR3 = Third Qualifying Round
QR4 = Fourth Qualifying Round
RInt = Intermediate Round
R1 = Round 1
R2 = Round 2
R3 = Round 3
R4 = Round 4

R5 = Round 5
R6 = Round 6
GS = Group stage
R16 = Round of 16
QF = Quarter-finals
SF = Semi-finals
RU = Runners-up
S = Shared
W = Winners

Current squad

Out on loan

Managerial history
Head coaches by years (2007–present)

Honours

Domestic competitions

League
Thai League 1
 Winners (4): 2009, 2010, 2012, 2016
 Runners-up (3): 2013, 2015, 2017
Thai Division 1 League
 Winners (1): 2008
Regional League Division 2:
 Champions (1): 2007

Cups
Kor Royal Cup:
 Champions (1): 2010
 Runners-up (4): 2011, 2013, 2014, 2016
FA Cup:
 Runners-up (3): 2010, 2011, 2015
League Cup:
 Champions (2):  2016, 2017
Thailand Champions Cup:
 Champions (1): 2017

International competitions

ASEAN
Mekong Club Championship
 Champions (1): 2017

See also
List of Muangthong United F.C. players

References

External links

 Muangthong United Official website
 

 
Thai League 1 clubs
Association football clubs established in 1989
Football clubs in Thailand
Sport in Nonthaburi province
1989 establishments in Thailand